The following article presents a summary of the 1943 football (soccer) season in Brazil, which was the 42nd season of competitive football in the country.

Campeonato Paulista

Final Standings

São Paulo declared as the Campeonato Paulista champions.

State championship champions

Other competition champions

Brazil national team
The Brazil national football team did not play any matches in 1943.

References

 Brazilian competitions at RSSSF
 1939-1946 Brazil national team matches at RSSSF

 
Seasons in Brazilian football
Brazil